Parallel Worlds, Parallel Lives is a BAFTA-winning television documentary broadcast in 2007 on BBC Scotland and BBC Four, in which American rock musician Mark Oliver Everett talks with physicists and the former colleagues of his father—Hugh Everett—about his father's many-worlds interpretation of quantum mechanics. The documentary was shot and directed by Louise Lockwood and edited by Folko Boermans.

The American premiere screening was at the 2008 inaugural World Science Festival in New York City.

The documentary was shown in full before each concert during the 2008 world tour of Eels.

A petition was started to persuade the BBC to issue the documentary on DVD.

Parallel Worlds, Parallel Lives was broadcast in the United States on the PBS program Nova on 21 October 2008.  The US version of the documentary features American voice actors for the narration. This version was available in DVD but has fallen out of print.

The British version of the documentary is narrated by Annie Mac. The NOVA version was narrated by journalist Stefanie E. Frame.

Everett called making the film "the single most rewarding experience of my life in many ways."

References

Further reading
 
 Healy, Pat, "‘Nova’ came for his soul: Eels front man on the healing power of a science doc about his dad" Metro newspaper, 21 October 2008.
Mark Oliver Everett, Things the Grandchildren Should Know, 
Nova review
Eels official website

Documentary films about science
BBC television documentaries
2007 television films
2007 films
2008 American television episodes
2007 documentary films
Eels (band)
Nova (American TV program) episodes
2000s British films